Neomaniola is a Neotropical butterfly genus in the family Nymphalidae. The genus is monotypic containing the single species Neomaniola euripides, which is found in Bolivia and Argentina.

References

Satyrinae
Nymphalidae of South America
Monotypic butterfly genera
Nymphalidae genera